Jyotirindranath Tagore (4 May 1849 – 4 March 1925) was a playwright, a musician, an editor and a painter. He played a major role in the flowering of the talents of his younger brother, the first non-European Nobel Prize winner, Rabindranath Tagore.

Works
 Historical plays -Purubikram (1874), Sarojini (1875), Ashrumati (Woman in tears, 1879), Swapnamayi (Lady of Dream, 1882).
 Satirical plays - Kinchit Jalajog (Some Refreshments, 1873), Eman Karma Ar Korbo Na (I will never do such a thing again 1877), Hathath Nabab (Suddenly a Ruler, 1884), Alik Babu (Strange Man, 1900).
 Translations - Kalidas's Abhijñānaśākuntalam (The Recognition of Shakuntala) and Malati Madhava (Malati and Madhava); Sudrak's Mrichhatika (Little Clay Cart); Marcus Aurelius’ Meditations, Shakespeare's Julius Caesar; Bal Gangadhar Tilak’s Gita Rahasya.

References

1849 births
1925 deaths
Hindu School, Kolkata alumni
Presidency University, Kolkata alumni
Bengali writers
Brahmos
Writers from Kolkata
Vangiya Sahitya Parishad
Translators to Bengali
People from Ranchi
Jyotirindranath
Musicians from Jharkhand
Dramatists and playwrights from West Bengal
20th-century Indian dramatists and playwrights
19th-century Indian dramatists and playwrights
19th-century Indian male writers
Indian editorial cartoonists
Musicians from Kolkata
Indian male painters
19th-century Indian painters
20th-century Indian painters
20th-century Indian male writers
19th-century translators
19th-century Indian male artists
20th-century Indian male artists